John Francis Cregan (January 29, 1878 – December 26, 1965) was an early twentieth century American athlete who specialised in the 800 metres. He participated in Athletics at the 1900 Summer Olympics in Paris and won the Silver medal in the Men's 800 metres event. He was born in Schenectady, New York and died in Philadelphia. He attended Princeton University.

References

External links

1878 births
1965 deaths
American male middle-distance runners
Athletes (track and field) at the 1900 Summer Olympics
Medalists at the 1900 Summer Olympics
Olympic silver medalists for the United States in track and field
Princeton University alumni
Sportspeople from Schenectady, New York
Track and field athletes from New York (state)
20th-century American people